Scotty Wood Stadium is the college football, field hockey, and track and field stadium of Muhlenberg College in Allentown, Pennsylvania. The college's athletics teams are known as the Muhlenberg Mules.

History

Scotty Wood Stadium was opened and dedicated in 1999. The stadium's bleacher capacity is 3,000. In 2008, the stadium's football field was resurfaced with AstroTurf. The stadium's track, used by its track and field team, underwent all-weather resurfacing in 2014. 

The stadium is named for Milton W. "Scotty" Wood, founder of Wood Dining Services. The stadium's field is named for Frank Marino, who served as Muhlenberg's head football coach from 1970 to 1980, head coach of its men's lacrosse team from 1968 to 1977, and head coach of its volleyball team from 1988 to 1995. 

Since its 1999 opening, the stadium has hosted three Centennial Conference championship track meets, four NCAA tournament football games, and an ECAC field hockey playoff game.

References

External links
 

1999 establishments in Pennsylvania
American football venues in Pennsylvania
Buildings and structures in Allentown, Pennsylvania
College field hockey venues in the United States
College football venues
College track and field venues in the United States
Muhlenberg College
Muhlenberg Mules
Muhlenberg Mules football
Multi-purpose stadiums in the United States
Sports venues completed in 1999
Sports venues in Allentown, Pennsylvania